Television consumption is a major part of media consumption in Western culture. Similar to other high-consumption ways of life, television watching is prompted by a quest for pleasure, escape, and "anesthesia." Obsessively watching television can be compared with common criteria for addictions, such as the inability to function at work or home, and negative consequences may arise from heavy or addictive consumption.

Statistics 
In the US, there are an estimated 119.9 million TV households in the TV season 2018/19.

In 2017, an average U.S. consumer spent 238 minutes (3h 58min) daily watching TV.
While overall media consumption continues to rise, live TV consumption was on the decline in 2016.

In 2009 the numbers were generally lower but still amounted to 9 years in front of the screen for an average 65-year-old American (more than 4 h/day, 28 h/week). Given the 30% of local TV news broadcast time devoted to advertising, this results in 2 million TV commercials seen by the average person by age 65. An average child in the US will see 20,000 30-second TV commercials per year. The time spent watching commercials is reduced when watching recorded TV. It has even been surmised that due to media multitasking, TV commercials are largely ignored.

Change in consumption 
With the growing effect of streaming sites and online television, there is an upward trend towards OTT (over-the-top) streaming sites, which causes a disruptive effect on cable television. In 2013, 63% of the households in the United States have been using a video streaming and delivery service, and 22% of those households watch Netflix every week of the year. In English Canada, Netflix is owned by 25% of households, and that increases to 33% for households with teens. Having the ability to watch commercial-free episodes at any given time and however and wherever the consumer desires, Netflix is shifting the way viewers consume television to a more digitalized, online manner. The COVID-19 pandemic forced the world to stay inside, unable to travel or go to work in most cases, this affected television consumption as people did not have many other activities able to do. As a result, studies taken between May and December 2020 showed that Americans averaged 3.1 hours a day of television. In 2020, watching television, whether it was viewing DVD’s, streaming shows, watching cable, or watching on a portable device, was the leisure activity that occupied the most time out of any activity.

Binge-watching 

Binge-watching is the act of watching multiple episodes of a program in a single sitting. This phenomenon originated in the Digital Age when streaming videos became easily accessible due to the advancement in technology and the low costs of unlimited bandwidth. Binge-watching has initiated the notion that by using this style of consumption, viewers have a greater understanding and knowledge of the show and character development, versus viewers who don't binge-watch. This overall greater understanding of the viewer has caused program executives and scholars to create a deeper understanding of uses and gratifications to continue to motivate consumers to use this style of viewing.

In the summer of 2013, all the episodes to Season 4 of Arrested Development (TV series) was released on Netflix, and 10% of their viewers watched the entire season in 24 hours. When House of Cards (U.S. TV series) and Orange Is the New Black also released full seasons at a time in 2013 on Netflix, high percentage of viewers watched back-to-back episodes and finished the seasons within days. Even though these series are all different genres, the truth of binge-watching remains constant widespread.

A risk of binge-watching is that it may lead a viewer to developing symptoms of behavioral addiction. Binge-watching in order to gain instant satisfaction is a negative coping strategy of behavioral addiction that may be compared to gambling in terms of its problematic nature. One of the most popular motivations for problematic binge-watching is the ability to experience escape and to overcome a feeling of loneliness. Even though binge-watching is not inherently bad, excessive binge-watching may be a result of existing mental health disorders such as depression and social anxiety, and it may be harmful for vulnerable individuals.

In 2013, a research study showed that 62% of the American population admit to binge-watching on a regular basis. Studies show that people between the age of 18 and 39 are more likely to binge-watch TV shows compared to people 39 and older and of these ages regarding gender the only statistical difference is what genre of television each gender prefers more. There have been an increased amount of studies on the effects of binge-watching, some showing that binge-watching is similar to addictions to video games and social media addiction as it provides immediate gratification which can cause the watcher to lose self-control and spend more time watching than they initially anticipated. Research done by Merill and Rubenking also shows a relation between binge-watching and procrastination.

Television consumption and obesity 
Across cultures, television consumption has been associated to cause an overweight, inactive lifestyle among high school students across the United States. Sedentary activities, such as consuming television, combined with soda consumption create positive energy in adolescents and contributes to childhood obesity. From a sample of over 15,000 high school students, 43% of those students exceeded 2 hours a day of television viewing on a regular school day. Overall, 31% of the sample did not participate in daily physical activity, 11% were overweight, and 76% ate an insufficient amount of servings of fruit and vegetables. Watching television for 2 hours a day was correlated to being overweight and sedentary for White male and females, as well as Hispanic females. Among Black males, the amount of television consumption was associated with an increase on physical activity. There was no correlation for Black females and Hispanic males.

Television and body attitudes among adolescents 
In a study of 1,452 high school students, there was an association between what type of television was consumed and the effects each genre had on the body image of an adolescent. It was found that time watching soap operas had a direct correlation with a drive to thinness in both genders, and also the drive for muscularity in boys. Entertainment, social learning, and escape from negative effect are seen as the three main components of television usage, and other than entertainment, the components have a significant correlations to negative outcomes for both males and females. This study suggests that the correlation between negative body images among adolescents and television consumption is based on the types of content and motives for watching, not the total amount. In terms of the content that is being displayed in these television programs, it is important to evaluate the quality that are given to the characters, by extension, the actors and actresses of these programs. The main characters of these televised programs are frequently portrayed by actors and actresses that fit into the attractive and thinner beauty standards. These attractive and thin actors and actresses frequently portray characters that are given successful story arcs and positions within their programs. In comparison, the actors and actresses that are viewed as less attractive and not as thin as their co-stars often portray characters that are utilized as the butt of jokes or less successful. These portrayals go beyond the screen as these main actors and actresses are also viewed as successful as their television characters.  These media portrayals and the promotion of the 'thin ideal' create a standard that physical beauty is the most important element of a woman as well as establishes more benefits for those that can fit into these ideas of beauty. In contrast, the standard would reenforce a conflicting standard that those that do not fit into these beauty ideals will not have access to these benefits and would be more likely to be subjected to negative social attitudes.

Crime shows and attitudes towards crime 
As research has suggested, the majority of public knowledge about crime and justice is learned from the media. Since the study did not factor in the difference in types of crime and investigation shows, the study could not include insight on what type of crime show caused what behaviour/attitude. However, it concluded that regular consumption of various crime shows is not related to perceived police effectiveness and punishment-type attitudes, but is related to the viewers overall fear of crime. Also, the amount of time spent viewing these shows had no correlation to perceived police effectiveness, punitive attitudes, or fear of crime. Further research has suggested that the correlation to crime shows and viewer's attitudes of crime, is dependent on program type. Programs that showcased more fear driven responses were those that depicted a more violence centered viewing. Another element for higher fear driven attitudes was dependent on just how realistic the stories are and if the location of the event is near the viewer. Examples of different program types would be that national news does not showcase much in terms of violence, location or realism had a lower fear response while local news does showcase these elements in a higher degree, thus, promoting a higher fear response. Even though both programs often have a conclusion to these crimes, it does not have much of an affect in reducing people's fear towards crime.

Global view
In 2014, counting all four possible "screens"  (TV set, PC, mobile phone/smartphone and tablet computer) and taking into account time-shifted TV, the worldwide consumption had risen by 7 minutes over 2013. Slight decreases in North America and Asia were more than compensated by increases in Latin America and Africa. The most popular genre worldwide, according to observations at 2016's TV and digital content event MIPTV, is drama.

The United States lead the global list of daily TV viewing time in 2015, followed by Poland, Japan, Italy, and Russia. According to other statistics, the UK was top, followed by the US, France, Indonesia, Kenya and Nigeria in 2014. In 2002, the US and the UK were ranked equal with 28 hours per person per week, followed by Italy, Germany, France, and Ireland.

Besides the continuing slow decline in average viewing times for the traditional linear TV, ZenithMedia has predicted a decline also for the number of viewers in 2015 also

As in the US, worldwide media consumption continues to rise, but live TV consumption was on the decline in 2015 and predicted to drop even further with a marked decrease from 2010 from 195.6 min/day to 179.5 min/day (~3 h/day, 21 h/week).

See also

Digital divide
Internet television (Online TV)
People meter
Smart TV
Social aspects of television
Streaming service
Television addiction
Television advertising
Television program
Television studies

References

External links

consumption
Television studies